Ceratina dupla, the doubled ceratina, is a species of small carpenter bee in the family Apidae. It is found in the eastern half of North America. It was formerly confused with the species Ceratina floridana and Ceratina mikmaqi, until molecular analyses demonstrated significant genetic differences between the taxa.

References

Further reading

External links

 

dupla
Articles created by Qbugbot
Insects described in 1837